The Cappadocian calendar was a solar calendar that was derived from the Persian Zoroastrian calendar. It is named after the historic region Cappadocia in present-day Turkey, where it was used. The calendar, which had 12 months of 30 days each and five epagomenal days, originated between 550 and 330 BC, when Cappadocia was part of the Persian Achaemenid Empire. The Cappadocian calendar was identical to the Zoroastrian calendar; this can be seen in its structure, in the Avestan names and in the order of the months. The Cappadocian calendar reflects the Iranian cultural influence in the region. Extant evidence of the calendar dates back to Late Antiquity through the accounts of Greek astronomers, by which time it had already been adapted to the Julian calendar.

Context
The Cappadocian calendar was evidently devised at a time when Cappadocia, a historical region in present-day Turkey, was a province (satrapy) of the Achaemenid Empire. The calendar is named after the region in which it was used; there is no consensus about its precise starting date. According to the historian Josef Marquart, the calendar commenced in 490 BC, whereas according to the philologist Jacques Duchesne-Guillemin, it began between 490 and 480 BC. It is a solar calendar that had 360 days divided into 12 months, which were followed by five epagomenal days.

The calendar was effectively an imitation of the Zoroastrian one; because the Persians were the dominant political group in Cappadocia at the time, it became the region's main calendar and survived as such in the Kingdom of Cappadocia. Although the passage of time and local dialect differences resulted in minor differences in spelling, the names of the months of the Cappadocian calendar are almost identical to those of the Zoroastrian (Avestan) calendar. The Persians in Cappadocia spoke western Iranian; therefore, the Cappadocian month-names are in some aspects linguistically closer to Middle Persian (Pahlavi) spelling rather than Avestan spelling. The Cappadocian forms, however, are more archaic and are closer in this regard to the Avestan forms. 

The Cappadocian calendar is evidence of the long-lasting Iranian cultural and religious influences on Cappadocia. According to the Iranologist Mary Boyce, the Cappadocian calendar, together with the Middle Persian, Parthian, Sogdian, Khwarazmian, Bactrian, and Old Armenian calendars, were all derived from the Achaemenian state calendar that the Persians had introduced in the early Achaemenid period to establish the "accepted means of time-reckoning for all their Zoroastrian subjects". Over time, local language changes resulted in different local versions. Other than that, these calendars are almost identical. The Cappadocian calendar survived through the texts of Greek astronomers of Late Antiquity and was still known as late as the 4th century AD.

Names of the months

According to Boyce and the historian Frantz Grenet, the "exactness in the main of the correspondences between the calendars" shows the uses adopted by the Zoroastrians in Cappadocia were "largely uniform". They add that the only divergences lay in the substitution of Teiri (Teirei) for Avestan Tištrya, a change reportedly widespread in many Zoroastrian communities, and the "dedication of the eight month" to Apąm Napāt ("son of the waters") rather than to Apąm ("waters"), here being Varuna. Boyce and Grenet wrote that this "month-dedication" was apparently unique to the Cappadocian calendar, meaning there may have been controversy among the Zoroastrians in Cappadocia regarding the elevation of Anahita over Varuna. Boyce and Grenet add that this phenomenon shows that even under the strong polity created by the Achaemenids in a region known for its strong Persian religious influences, the local Persian priests apparently held some minor priestly autonomy.

Adaption to the Julian calendar
Although the Cappadocian calendar originated during the Achaemenid period, extant evidence only dates back to Late Antiquity, when it had already been adapted to the Julian calendar. The historian Sacha Stern stated that the Cappadocian calendar may have been adapted to the Julian calendar in 44 BC. It was probably the first calendar in the Roman East to become "Julianized", even before the Egyptian calendar. Even after the "Julianization" of the calendar in the Roman period, however, the date of the Cappadocian New Year was still "approximately compatible to an originally Persian Zoroastrian calendar", and its structure was still based on the original Persian calendar of 12 months of 30 days followed by five epagomenal days.

Notes

References

Sources
 
 
 
 
 
 
 
 
 

Zoroastrian calendar
Achaemenid Empire
Achaemenid Cappadocia
Specific calendars
Kingdom of Cappadocia